The 2004 Girabola was the 26th season of top-tier football in Angola. The season ran from 15 February to 6 November 2004. ASA were the defending champions.

The league comprised 14 teams, the bottom three of which were relegated to the 2005 Gira Angola.

ASA were crowned champions, winning a third title in a row, while Académica do Soyo, Benfica do Lubango and Bravos do Maquis, the three clubs that were promoted that same season, were relegated.

Arsénio Kabungula aka Love of ASA finished as the top scorer with 17 goals.

Changes from the 2004 season
Relegated: Benfica de Luanda, Desportivo da Huíla and Ritondo 
Promoted: Académica do Soyo, Benfica do Lubango and Bravos do Maquis

League table

Results

Season statistics

Top scorers

Hat-tricks

References

External links
Girabola 2004 standings at girabola.com
Federação Angolana de Futebol

Girabola seasons
Angola
Angola
2004 in Angolan football